St. Lawrence Parish is a Roman Catholic church in Shelton, Connecticut, part of the  Diocese of Bridgeport.

History 
St Lawrence Parish is located in the Huntington section of Shelton and, with over 3,000 registered families, is one of the largest parishes in the Diocese. The modern church was constructed shortly after the parish was formed in 1955. The architect was J. Gerald Phelan. A recent renovation doubled the size of the church and added a parish center.

References

External links 
 St. Lawrence - website
 Diocese of Bridgeport

Roman Catholic churches in Connecticut
Churches in Fairfield County, Connecticut
Buildings and structures in Shelton, Connecticut